Acacia benthamii is a shrub of the genus Acacia and the subgenus Plurinerves. It is native to an area along the west coast in the Perth metropolitan region and Wheatbelt region of Western Australia.

Description
It blooms from August to September and produces yellow flowers.

Taxonomy
The species was first formally described by the botanist Carl Meissner in 1844 in the Johann Georg Christian Lehmann work Plantae Preissianae. It was reclassified as Racosperma benthamii by Leslie Pedley in 2003,  but returned to the genus Acacia in 2006.
It is closely related to Acacia sessilis and closely resembles Acacia cochlearis.

Etymology
The specific epithet, benthamii, honours George Bentham.

Distribution
It is endemic to the west of Western Australia from around Dandaragan in the north to around Subiaco in the south and is commonly found on limestone breakaways.

See also
 List of Acacia species

References

benthamii
Endemic flora of Southwest Australia
Taxa named by Carl Meissner
Plants described in 1844